Cazania lui Varlaam (the Homiliary of Varlaam) also known as Carte Românească de Învăţătură (the Romanian Book of Learning) is a book edited by the Metropolitan of Moldavia Varlaam Moţoc in 1643.

History
In 1643, the Moldavian Prince Vasile Lupu sponsored the Books of Homilies translated by Metropolitan of Moldavia Varlaam from Slavonic into Romanian (pre limba Romeniască) and titled Carte Românească de Învăţătură (Romanian Book  of Learning) . The foreword by Prince Lupu says that it is addressed to the entire Romanian nation everywhere (la toată semenția românească de pretutindeni). The book, also known as Cazania lui Varlaam ("The Cazania of Varlaam" or "Varlaam's Homiliary"), was the very first printed in Moldavia and large numbers of copies spread in the neighboring provinces inhabited by Romanian speakers.

Gallery

References 
Mureșanu, Florea. Cazania lui Varlaam, 1643 - 1943: Prezentare in imagini (1944). 
Dudaș, Florian. Cazania lui Varlaam în Transilvania: studiu istoric și bibliologic (2005).

External links 
  Cazania Lui Barlaam: 1643-1943
  CAZANIALUI VARLAAM, IaŞi, 1643

1643 books
History of Moldavia (1504–1711)
Culture in Iași
17th-century history books
Romanian books